Whitewater River may refer to:

 The occurrence of whitewater rapids in rivers
 Whitewater river (river type), a classification used in contrast to clear and blackwater rivers, mainly in South America

Specific rivers in the United States
 Whitewater River (California)
 Whitewater River (Keowee River tributary), in North Carolina and South Carolina
 Whitewater River (Great Miami River tributary), in Indiana and Ohio
 Whitewater River (Kansas)
 Whitewater River (Minnesota)
 Whitewater River (Missouri)
 Whitewater River (Oregon)

Specific rivers outside the United States
 Whitewater River (New Zealand)

See also
 List of whitewater rivers
 Whitewater (disambiguation)
 Whitewater Canyon (disambiguation)